The Podgorica Railway Station is a railway station located in Podgorica, Montenegro.

The current station was built after World War II, and it was upgraded gradually to its current shape and capacity up until the 1970s.

It is the only train station located in Podgorica, and serves as a hub for Railways of Montenegro. The Belgrade–Bar railway converges with the line to Nikšić and line to Shkodër at the station. The station is a through station, located on a trunk line that bisects Podgorica in a north–south direction.

The station building was not planned as a permanent passenger station, but rather as an administration and control centre for the Montenegrin railway system. The passenger terminal was meant to be built as a separate building. However, due to the lack of funds, the current building is still serving as a provisional passenger terminal. Thus, the waiting room, restaurant, ticket booths and retail facilities are of inadequate capacity, and the quality of service is subpar when compared to the main stations of cities of similar size.

There are three tracks for passenger service, served by one side platform adjacent to the terminal building, and one island platform, with a pedestrian crossing between the two. The area further from the station terminal building is occupied by the largest rail yard in Montenegro, where there are numerous service, repair, freight and other facilities used by the various Montenegrin railway companies. The large area surrounding the station, coupled with the headquarters and operational services situated in the station building, make up the heart of the Montenegrin railway system.

References

Transport in Podgorica
Railway stations in Montenegro
Railway stations opened in 1927